Roberto Pagán Centeno (born January 11, 1943) is a Puerto Rican politician and former mayor of Lares. Pagán is affiliated with the New Progressive Party (PNP) and had served as mayor from 2005 to January 2020.

References

Living people
Mayors of places in Puerto Rico
New Progressive Party (Puerto Rico) politicians
People from Lares, Puerto Rico
1943 births